Miss Argentina is a national beauty pageant in Argentina, founded in 1928. In 1962, Norma Nolan of Santa Fe became the first, and only, Miss Argentina to win the title of Miss Universe. Currently, the competition is managed by Nadia Cerri, a beauty pageant entrepreneur.

History

1928–1937
The Miss Argentina beauty contest was established in 1928 by El Hogar Magazine in Mar del Plata, Buenos Aires. The first winner was Túlia Ciámpoli of Cordoba. The pageant was attended by the President of Argentina, Marcelo T. de Alvear, and his wife Regina Pacini. The 1929 competition was organized by Caras y Caretas, a weekly magazine, and was won by Nelida Rodriguez Aragon. 

In 1930, Critical magazine took over the event. In the same year, the winner of Miss Argentina (Celia Basavilbaso of Chaco) competed for the title of Miss Universe, in the International Pageant of Pulchritude, for the first time. In 1932, the News Carts Newspaper Corporation began organizing Miss Argentina and that year's winner, Ana Rover, competed in the penultimate International Pageant of Pulchritude, which was held in Belgium. 

In 1937, after a five-year hiatus, the competition returned and was won by Elba Tardits.

1954–1969

In 1954, the competition returned and was organised by Mundo Redial Production. Ivana Olga Kislinger won the title of Miss Argentina and went on to compete in Miss Universe 1954, which was held in California. This was the first time Miss Argentina competed in the new Miss Universe competition, which was established in 1952. 

Norma Nolan, from Santa Fe, won Miss Argentina in 1962 and went on to become the first Argentinian to win the title of Miss Universe. The competition was held in Miami, Florida. 

In 1965, Canal 7 broadcast Miss Argentina for the first time.  In 1967, the Naico Agency took over the Miss Universe franchise in Argentina and the next year John Fischer and Channel 13 hosted the pageant at Casino Program.

1970–1999
In 1970, Héctor Larrea presented Miss Argentina, which was broadcast on Canal 13. In 1979, El Mundo del Espectáculo became the official program to select Miss Argentina's winner. In 1993, the Senorita Argentina contest was held by Nelly Raymond- this was the first year that Miss Argentina held the title of Senorita Argentina.

2000–2018
Between 2000 and 2003, Fenix Production and Fundación Favaloro held the Miss Argentina competition in Buenos Aires. In 2006, Mirta Schuster became the owner of the Miss Argentina beauty contest and renamed it the annual Miss Universo Argentina. In 2016, The Endamol Argentina  and TNT Latin America became the owners of  the Miss Universe franchise in Argentina.

2019–present
Since 2019, the Miss Argentina competition has been officially managed by Osmel Sousa. In 2020 acquires the franchise of the Miss International.

Winners

Gallery

Titleholders ( 1928-present)

Statistic rankings

Titleholders under Miss Argentina org.

Miss Universo Argentina

References

External links
 Belleza Argentina'

Argentina
Beauty pageants in Argentina
Recurring events established in 1954
1954 establishments in Argentina
Argentine awards